Golobinjek is a settlement in the Municipality of Mirna Peč in southeastern Slovenia. The area is part of the historical region of Lower Carniola. The municipality is now included in the Southeast Slovenia Statistical Region. 

The local church is dedicated to Saint Ursula and belongs to the Parish of Mirna Peč. It dates to the 17th century.

References

External links
Golobinjek on Geopedia

Populated places in the Municipality of Mirna Peč